John Albert Guarnieri (March 23, 1917 – January 7, 1985) was an American jazz and stride pianist, born in New York City.

Career
Guarnieri joined the George Hall orchestra in 1937. He is possibly best known for his big band stints with Benny Goodman in 1939 and with Artie Shaw in 1940. Guarnieri is also noted for his embellishment and juxtaposition of jazz with classical piano, such as Scarlatti and Beethoven.

Throughout the 1940s, Guarnieri was active as a sideman, recording with artists such as Charlie Christian, Cozy Cole, Ike Quebec, Charlie Kennedy, Hank D'Amico and Ben Webster. He also led his own group called the "Johnny Guarnieri Swing Men" and recorded with them on the Savoy label, a group that included Lester Young, Hank D'Amico, Billy Butterfield and Cozy Cole. He also led a trio in the 1940s composed of himself, Slam Stewart and Sammy Weiss, recording again for Savoy. During the 1940s, he also recorded for the short-lived Majestic label, playing solo piano and with his trio.

In the 1940s, he also played harpsichord in the Gramercy Five, a small band led by Artie Shaw; his solos were the first examples of jazz recorded on the instrument.

In 1946, Guarnieri's trio was broadcast twice by the BBC Home Service in the UK in a short series highlighting American, British and French jazz artists dubbed as 'Kings of Jazz'. The 18 January and 
29 March episodes featured his trio with Guarnieri (piano), Slam Stewart (bass), and Sidney Catlett (drums), and was introduced by Alistair Cooke.

In 1949, Guarnieri recorded an album with June Christy entitled June Christy & The Johnny Guarnieri Quintet. In his later years Guarnieri shifted more toward jazz education. In commemoration of his reputation as a teacher, Guarnieri's students financed a label for him called "Taz Jazz Records". In the 1970s, Guarnieri recorded numerous albums on his new label, and until 1982 worked at the "Tail of the Cock" nightclub in Studio City, California. In the early 1980s, Guarnieri recorded Johnny Guarnieri Plays Duke Ellington on a Bösendorfer Grand "SE" player piano, for the Live-Performance Jazz Series.

Death
Guarnieri was based in Los Angeles later in his life, but traveled to the East Coast to play a concert in January 1985. He played at the Vineyard Theatre at East 26th Street in New York City on January 6, but had to stop at the intermission because of dizziness. He went to a friend's house to rest, but was admitted to St Barnabas hospital in Livingston, New Jersey the following day, where he died following a heart attack.

Personal life
He was survived by his wife, Jeanne, six children, and 18 grandchildren.

Select discography
 Makin' Whoopee (Dobre)

With Cozy Cole
 Concerto for Cozy (Savoy, 1944)

With Tony Mottola, Cozy Cole and Bob Haggart
 An Hour of Modern Piano Rhythms (Royale, 1953)

With the Henri René Orchestra
 RCA Victor Presents Eartha Kitt (RCA, 1953)
 That Bad Eartha (EP) (RCA, 1954)
 Down to Eartha (RCA, 1955)
 That Bad Eartha (LP) (RCA, 1956)
 Thursday's Child (RCA, 1957)

With Ben Webster
 "Honeysuckle Rose" b/w "Kat's Fur" (Savoy, 1944 )

With Lester Young  (Keynote, 1943)
 "Sometimes I'm Happy"
 "Just You, Just Me"
 "I Never Knew"
 "Afternoon of a Basie-ite"

With Trio
 Makin' Whoopee (Dobre Records DR1017, 1978)

References

External links
Johnny Guarnieri at discogs.com
Johnny Guarnieri at allmusic.com

1917 births
1985 deaths
Swing pianists
Stride pianists
American jazz pianists
American male pianists
20th-century American pianists
20th-century American male musicians
American male jazz musicians
Savoy Records artists
RCA Records artists
Black & Blue Records artists
Majestic Records artists